Taffuh (lit. fragrance) is a Palestinian town located eight kilometers west of Hebron.The town is in the Hebron Governorate in the southern West Bank. According to the Palestinian Central Bureau of Statistics, the town had a population of over 10,597 in 2007.

History 
The city of Beth-tappuah, literally House of Apple [tree], cited in the Book of Joshua (15: 53), is often located in the hill country of the Tribe of Judah, 5 km west northwest of Hebron. Archaeological finds in the vicinity of the hill site include remains of an ancient road, a well to the west, cisterns, and rock-cuttings. Some, but not all, experts identify this now with the modern Palestinian village established not far from the cite.
The PEF's Survey of Western Palestine (SWP) noted: "Evidently an ancient site; there are caves here, with trenches leading down to them, as at Khurbet 'Aziz, and the rock is quarried. An ancient road leads past the village."

Ottoman era
In the Ottoman census of the 1500s,   Taffuh was located in the nahiya of Halil.

In 1838, Edward Robinson noted Teffuh  as Muslim village, located north of el-Khulil, and west of the road from Jerusalem. Robinson further described it as: "an old village [..] it contains a good number of inhabitants, and lies in the midst of olive groves  and vineyards, with marks of industry and thrift on every side. Indeed many of the former terraces along the hill sides are still in use [..] Several portions of walls, apparently those of an old fortress, are visible among the houses..."

In 1863 Victor Guérin visited, and found the village to have 400 inhabitants. He also noted that several houses seemed ancient.
An Ottoman village list of about 1870 counted 54 houses and a population of 161, though the population count included men.

In 1883, the PEF's Survey of Western Palestine (SWP) described Taffuh as "A village of ancient appearance, standing high at the edge of a ridge ; on the north are the steep slopes of Wady Kedir, in which are olives belonging to the place. An ancient main-road passes through the village, and runs along flat ground to the west for a little way, then descends the ridge. There is a well to the west, with cisterns, caves, and rock-cuttings. The village has vineyards round it, and good springs in the valley to the west."

British Mandate era
In the 1922 census of Palestine conducted by the British Mandate authorities, Taffuh had a population of 461 inhabitants, all Muslims, increasing in the 1931 census to 580, all Muslim, in 124 inhabited houses.

In the 1945 statistics the population of Taffuh was 780, all Muslims, who owned 12,103 dunams of land  according to an official land and population survey. 1,073 dunams were plantations and irrigable land,  3,543 for cereals, while 31 dunams were built-up (urban) land.

1948-1967
In the wake of the 1948 Arab–Israeli War, and after the 1949 Armistice Agreements, Taffuh came under Jordanian rule.

The Jordanian census of 1961 found 1,282 inhabitants in Taffuh.

1967-present
Since the Six-Day War in 1967, Taffuh  has been under Israeli occupation.

Footnotes

Bibliography
 

  

  
  
 

 
 (pp. 29-30)

External links
Welcome To Taffuh
Survey of Western Palestine, Map 21:    IAA, Wikimedia commons 
Taffuh Town (Fact Sheet),   Applied Research Institute–Jerusalem (ARIJ)
Taffuh Town Profile, ARIJ
Taffuh aerial photo, ARIJ
The priorities and needs for development in Taffuh town based on the community and local authorities’ assessment, ARIJ

Towns in the West Bank
Hebron Governorate
Ancient Jewish settlements of Judaea
Municipalities of the State of Palestine